Agylla argentifera is a moth of the family Erebidae. It was described by Francis Walker in 1866. It is found in Mexico, Costa Rica, Venezuela and Brazil.

References

Moths described in 1866
argentifera
Moths of North America
Moths of South America